Johnnie Troutman (born November 11, 1987) is a former American football guard. Troutman was drafted with the 149th pick in the 5th round of the 2012 NFL Draft. He is credited with having the slowest 40-yard dash time, at 5.76 seconds.

Early life 
Troutman attended Pemberton Township High School in Pemberton, New Jersey where he played on both offensive and defensive lines.

College career 
Redshirted in 2007, Troutman played at Penn State from 2008 to 2011. He started his last three seasons at left guard for the Nittany Lions without allowing a sack and as a senior in 2011, Troutman did not commit a single penalty.  Troutman graduated in May 2011 with a degree in African-American studies. He is a charter member of the Eta Alpha chapter of Iota Phi Theta fraternity.

Professional career 
The San Diego Chargers drafted Troutman with a fifth-round pick (147) in the 2012 NFL Draft. He had surgery for a pectoral injury prior to the draft and spent the entire 2012 season on the “Reserve-Non-Football Injury” list. On May 10, signed a four-year, $2.3 million contract.
In the 2013 season, Troutman competed for the starting left guard spot. For the 2014 season Troutman was promoted to the starting position at right guard due to Jeromey Clary's hip surgery.

He was placed on injured reserve due to a forearm injury on September 29. And was released by the team in 2016. He hasn't played a game since the injury which put him on the team's IR list, although still remains in the NFL Free Agency.  He is hopeful that a team will need his services so he can play again. He has admitted that his Pro Career has left him feeling under accomplished and a lot left to be desired.

References

External links 
Penn State Nittany Lions bio

1987 births
Living people
American football offensive guards
Penn State Nittany Lions football players
People from Pemberton Township, New Jersey
Players of American football from New Jersey
San Diego Chargers players
Sportspeople from Burlington County, New Jersey